Avner Greif (born 1955) is an economics professor at Stanford University, Stanford, California. He holds a chaired professorship as Bowman Family Professor in the Humanities and Sciences.

Greif received his PhD in Economics at Northwestern University, where Joel Mokyr acted as his supervisor, in 1989 and started his career at Stanford University in 1989 until he received tenure in 1994. In 1998 he received a 'genius grant' from the MacArthur Foundation. His works deal with economic history and role of institutions in economic development, including analysis of trade in medieval Europe and Levant.

Work
Greif specializes in the study of the social institutions that support economic development, and their history, incorporating game theory into his approach to this large subject. Greif is on the board of trustees of the International Society of New Institutional Economics.

In Institutions and the Path to the Modern Economy: Lessons from Medieval Trade (2006), Greif argues that institutions play a central role in economic development: Studying institutions sheds light on why some countries are rich and others poor, why some enjoy a welfare-enhancing political order and others do not. Socially beneficial institutions promote welfare-enhancing cooperation and action. They provide the foundations of markets by efficiently assigning, protecting, and altering property rights; securing contracts; and motivating specialization and exchange. Good institutions also encourage production by fostering saving, investment in human and physical capital, and development and adoption of useful knowledge. They maintain a sustainable rate of population growth and foster welfare-enhancing peace; the joint mobilization of resources; and beneficial policies, such as the provision of public goods. The quality of these institutional foundations of the economy and the polity is paramount in determining a society’s welfare. This is the case because individuals do not always recognize what will be socially beneficial nor are they motivated to pursue it effectively in the absence of appropriate institutions.

Selected publications

 (This paper is an updated version of "Risk, Institutions and Growth: Why England and Not China?")

References

External links

Avner Greif's Homepage at Stanford
Avner Greif's Homepage at Stanford Department of Economics

1955 births
Living people
Northwestern University alumni
Stanford University Department of Economics faculty
MacArthur Fellows
20th-century American economists
21st-century American economists
New institutional economists
Fellows of the Econometric Society
Fellows of the American Academy of Arts and Sciences